Nationality words link to articles with information on the nation's poetry or literature (for instance, Irish or France).

Events
 Poetry International started by Ted Hughes and Patrick Garland
 May 16 – the premiere at Taganka Theater in Moscow of the staged a poetical performance Послушайте! ("Listen!"), based on the works of Russian poet Vladimir Mayakovsky. The show was in repertoire until April 1984, was revived in May 1987 and again in repertoire until June 1989.
 Soviet authorities, acting through the Union of Soviet Writers, denied popular Russian poet Andrei Voznesensky permission to visit New York for a poetry reading at Lincoln Center, apparently because of remarks the poet made on a previous U.S. visit that were deemed pro-American, although the official reason was that Voznesensky's health was too poor for him to travel. In response, Voznesensky excoriated the literary union in a letter he sent to Pravda, which the newspaper refused to publish. Nevertheless, copies of the letter, accusing the literary-union authorities of "lies, lies, lies, bad manners and lies", were distributed widely in literary circles. On July 2, Voznesensky strongly criticized the literary union in a poem he read at the Taganka Theater in Moscow. The union demanded a retraction, but he refused. According to Voznesensky's 2010 obituary in the Times, "The issue was ultimately smoothed over".
New Writers Press is founded by poets Michael Smith and Trevor Joyce with Smith's wife Irene in Dublin to publish poetry.

Works published in English
Listed by nation where the work was first published and again by the poet's native land, if different; substantially revised works listed separately:

Pentti Saarikoski, Helsinki, a selection of poetry in translation from Finnish
 Wole Soyinka, Idanre, and Other Poems

Canada
 Margaret Atwood, The Circle Game, won a Governor General's award and "sold out immediately"
 John Robert Colombo, Abracadabra
 Louis Dudek, Atlantis. Montreal: Delta Canada, 1967.
 D. G. Jones, Phrases from Orpheus
 Irving Layton, Periods of the Moon: Poems. Toronto: McClelland and Stewart.
 Dennis Lee, Kingdom of Absence. Toronto: Anansi.
 Dorothy Livesay, The Unquiet Bed.
 Eli Mandel, An Idiot Joy, Governor General's Award 1967.
 Michael Ondaatje, The Dainty Monsters, Toronto: Coach House Press
 P. K. Page, Cry Ararat!: Poems New and Selected
 Al Purdy, North of Summer, a diary in verse recounting his stay on Baffin Island
 F. R. Scott, Trouvailles: Poems from Prose. Montreal: Delta Canada.
 A. J. M. Smith:
 Editor, A Book of Modern Canadian Verse, anthology
 Poems: New and Collected
Raymond Souster, As Is. Toronto: Oxford University Press.
 Raymond Souster, editor, New Wave Canada anthology of younger poets
 Miriam Waddington, The Glass Trumpet
 George Woodcock, Selected Poems of George Woodcock, Toronto: Clarke, Irwin, Canada

India
 A. K. Ramanujan, The Striders, Delhi: Oxford University Press
 Arvind Krishna Mehrotra, Woodcuts on Paper
 Kamala Das, The Descendants, Calcutta: Writers Workshop, India.
 Lawrence Bantleman:
 Kanchenjunga, Calcutta: Writers Workshop, India.
 New Poems, Calcutta: Writers Workshop, India
 Sukanta Chaudhuri, Poems, Calcutta: Writers Workshop, India
 Margaret Chatterjee, The Spring and the Spectacle, Calcutta: Writers Workshop, India
 A. Madhavan, Poems, Calcutta: Writers Workshop, India
 R. Rabindranath Menon, Dasavatara and Other Poems, Calcutta: Writers Workshop, India
 S. R. Mokashi-Punekar, The Pretender, Calcutta: Writers Workshop, India
 Mohinder Monga, Through the Night Raptly, Calcutta: Writers Workshop, India
 Tarpiti Mookerji, The Golden Road to Samarkand, Calcutta: Writers Workshop, India
 Suniti Namjoshi:
 Poems, Calcutta: Writers Workshop, India
 The Jackass and the Lady, Calcutta: Writers Workshop, India
 Stanley P. Rajiva, The Permanent Element, Calcutta: Writers Workshop, India
 S. Santhi, Lamplight in the Sun, Calcutta: Writers Workshop, India
 O. P. Bhagat, Another Planet, New Delhi: Lakshmi Books
 Sankara Krishna Chettur, Golden Stars and Other Poems, Madras: Higginbotham
 Harindranath Chattopadhyaya, Virgins and Vineyards, Bombay: Pearl Pub.
 Raul De Loyola Furtado, also known as Joseph Furtado (died 1947), Selected Poems, third edition, revised; Bombay: published by Philip Furdado (first edition 1942; second edition, revised 1947), posthumously published
 Monika Varma, translator, A Bunch of Tagore Poems, Calcutta: Writers Workshop
 Kushwant Singh, editor, The Asian PEN Anthology, Taplinger

New Zealand
 Fleur Adcock, Tigers, London: Oxford University Press (New Zealand poet who moved to England in 1963)
 James K. Baxter:
 The Lion Skin: Poems
 Aspects of Poetry in New Zealand, critical study
 The Man on the Horse, critical study
 Alistair Campbell, Blue Rain: Poems, Wellington: Wai-te-ata Press

United Kingdom
 Fleur Adcock, Tigers; New Zealander living in and published in the United Kingdom
 Kingsley Amis, A Look Round the Estate
 Patricia Beer, Just Like the Resurrection
 Martin Bell, Collected Poems, 1937–1966
 D. M. Black, With Decorum
 Alan Brownjohn, The Lions' Mouths
 T. S. Eliot, Poems Written in Early Youth, a second edition of the 1950 book of poems edited and privately printed by John Hayward (posthumous)
 Janet Frame, The Pocket Mirror
 Bryn Griffiths, The Stones Remember, London: J. M. Dent
 Geoffrey Grigson, A Skull in Salop, and Other Poems
 Thom Gunn, Touch
 Libby Houston, A Stained Glass Raree Show, London: Allison and Busby
 Ted Hughes, Wodwo, a collection of poems, a radio play and five stories
 Elizabeth Jennings, Collected Poems, 1967, London: Macmillan
 P. J. Kavanagh, On the Way to the Depot
 Thomas Kinsella, Nightwalker, and Other Poems
 George MacBeth, The Colour of Blood
 Hugh MacDiarmid, pen name of Christopher Murray Grieve; a Scot:
 A Lap of Honour, with some poems "previously almost unobtainable"
 Collected Poems, a revised edition
 Roger McGough, Frinck: A Day in the Life Of; and Summer with Monica
 Leslie Norris, Finding Gold
 Brian Patten, Little Johnny's Confession
 Tom Pickard, High on the Walls, used "Geordie" (Newcastle) slang
 James Reeves, Selected Poems, London: Allison and Busby
 Anthony Thwaite, The Stones of Emptiness
 Rosemary Tonks, Iliad of Broken Sentences, London: The Bodley Head
 Vernon Watkins, Selected Poems, 1930-60

Anthologies
 Edward Lucie-Smith (ed.), The Liverpool Scene anthology featuring work by the Mersey Beat poets Adrian Henri, Roger McGough and Brian Patten (publisher: Donald Carroll)
 The Mersey Sound, 10th volume in the Penguin Modern Poets series, including work by Liverpudlians Adrian Henri, Roger McGough, Brian Patten
 Stephen Bann, Concrete Poetry, poems originally written in English, German, Spanish and Portuguese
 Howard Sergeant, Commonwealth Poems of Today, covering 24 Commonwealth countries, published for The English Association by John Murray in the United Kingdom
 Duncan Glen (ed.), Poems Addressed to Hugh MacDiarmid
 Donald Allen and Robert Creeley (eds), The New Writing in the USA published by Penguin, including work by John Ashbery, William Burroughs, Allen Ginsberg, Jack Kerouac, Frank O'Hara, Charles Olson, prose as well as poetry

United States
 W. H. Auden, Collected Shorter Poems, 1927-1957, first published in the United Kingdom in 1966; English native published in the United States
 Ted Berrigan, Ron Padgett and Joe Brainard, Bean Spasms, in which no authors were listed for individual poems, although some were written by one poet, some in collaboration.
 Ted Berrigan, Many Happy Returns
 John Berryman, Berryman's Sonnets (New York: Farrar, Straus & Giroux)
 Paul Blackburn:
 The Reardon Poems
 The Cities
 Richard Brautigan, All Watched Over by Machines of Loving Grace, including the poem of the same name
 Gwendolyn Brooks, The bitch
 Robert Creeley, Words
 Ed Dorn, The North Atlantic Turbine, Fulcrum Press
 Robert Lowell, Near the Ocean, New York: Farrar, Straus and Giroux
 Carl Rakosi, Amulet (Rakosi's first published volume since 1941)
 W. S. Merwin, The Lice, New York: Atheneum
 Marianne Moore, Complete Poems
 J. R. R. Tolkien, The Road Goes Ever On, English writer, but this book first published in the United States; published in the United Kingdom in 1968
 Reed Whittemore, Poems, New and Selected
 James Wright, Shall We Gather at the River

Other in English
 Eavan Boland, New Territory, Ireland
 Edward Brathwaite, Rights of Passage, first part of his The Arrivants trilogy, which also includes Masks (1968) and Islands (1969), Caribbean
 Dom Moraes, Beldam & Others, a pamphlet of verse, India
 Chris Wallace-Crabbe, The Rebel General, Sydney: Angus & Robertson, Australia
 Lenrie Peters (Gambia), Satellites, London: Heinemann, African Writers Series No. 37
 Judith Wright, The Other Half, Australia

Works published in other languages
Listed by language and often by nation where the work was first published and again by the poet's native land, if different; substantially revised works listed separately:

Denmark
 Jørgen Gustava Brandt, Ateliers
 Klaus Høeck, Mit-enf-snee, 1967. Nuancer
 Jens Ørnsbo, a new collection of poems
 Klaus Rifbjerg, Fædrelandssang
 Henrik Nordbrandt, Miniaturer
 Jørgen Gustava Brandt, Ateliers ("Studios"), Denmark

French language

France
 Anne-Marie Albiach, Flammigere
 P. Chaullet, Soudaine écorce
 Lucienne Desnoues, Les Ors
 Jean Daive, Décimale blanche, Mercure de France
 R. Dubillard, Le dirai que je suis tombé
 Jean Follain, D'Après tout
 M. Fombeure, À Chat petit
 Jean Grosjean, Élegies, which won the Prix des Critiques
 Eugene Guilleveic, Euclidiennes
 Edmond Jabès, Yael
 Philippe Jaccottet, Airs
 J. Lebrau, Du Cyprès tourne l'ombre
 Francis Ponge:
 Le Nouveau Recueil
 Le Savon
 Raymond Queneau, Courir les rues
 Charles le Quintrec, Stances du verbe amour
 Jacques Roubaud, Σ, forms of "sonnets" arranged in a way reflecting the moves of the board game Go, and with the suggestion that the order might be rearranged; the title comes from the mathematical symbol for "belonging"
 Lilaine Wouters, Le Gel

Critical studies
 P. de Boisdeffre, La Poésie française de Baudelaire á nos jours
 René Étiemble, Poètes ou faiseurs, a critical study
 M. Guiney, La Poésie de Pierre Reverdy
 G. Sadoul, Aragon
 A. Alter, J. C. Renard

German language
 Paul Celan, Breathturn (Atemwende)

Germany
 Günter Grass, Ausgefragt (West Germany)
 Elfriede Jelinek, Lisas Schatten (Austrian writer published in West Germany)
 Karl Mickel, Vita nova mea (East Germany)

Hebrew

Israel
 B. Pomerantz, Shirim ("Poems"), introduction by N. Peniel (posthumous)
 N. Shtern, Bain ha-Arpilim ("Amid the Mists"), preface by A. Broides
 T. Carmi, ha-Unikorn Mistakel ba-Mareh ("The Unicorn Looks into the Mirror")
 Ori Bernstein, be-Ona ha-Kezarah ("In the Brief Season")
 Yaoz Kast, a book of collected poems
 Ozer Rabin, Shuv ve-shuv ("Again and Again")
 A. Aldon, a book of poems
 S. Pilus, a book of poems
 S. Tanny, Ad Shehigia ha-Yom (title translated by the author as "The Moment Came")
 D. Chomsky, Ezov ba-Even ("The Moss on the Stone")

United States
 Israel Efros, collected poems, four volumes
 Eliezer D. Friedland, Shirim be-Sulam Minor ("Poems in a Minor Key")
 Avraham Marthan, Shavot ha-Sirot Im Erev ("The Birds Return at Evening")
 Yizhak Finkel, Maginah Morikah ("Verdant Melody")

India
Listed in alphabetical order by first name:
 Hem Barua, Man Mayuri; Assamese-language
 Ramakant Rath, Anek Kothari ("Many Rooms"); Oriya-language
 Rituraj, Ek Marandharma aur Anya; Hindi-language
 Sitakant Mahapatra, Astapadi ("Eight Steps"); Oriya-language
 Sugathakumari, Pathirappookkal ("Midnight Flowers"); Malayalam-language
 Umashankar Joshi, Abhijna; Gujarati-language

Italy
 Lino Curci, Gli operai della terra
 Antonio Veneziano, Ottave (posthumous)
 Carlo Vallini, Un giorno (posthumous)
 Enrico Falqui, editor, Tutte le poesie della "Voce", anthology

Portuguese language

Brazil
 José Paulo Paes, Anatomías
 Affonso Avila, Resíduos Seiscentista em Minas, a study of the barique poetry of Minas Gerais

Spanish language

Chile
 Rosamel del Valle, a book of poetry, posthumously published
 Humberto Díaz Casanueva, El sol ciego
 Gabriela Mistral, Poema de Chile ("Poem of Chile"), posthumously published

Spain
 Gastón Basquero, Memorial de un testigo (Cuban resident of Spain)
 Gabriel Celaya, Lo que faltaba: Precedido de la linterna sorda y Música de baile
 Manuel Tuñón de Lara, Antonio Machado, poeta del pueblo a critical study

Yiddish
 Dovid Sfard, Barefoot Steps (Poland)

Israel
 Yankev Fridman, Loving Kindness
 Rikude Potash, a book of poems (posthumous)

United States
 Rokhl Korn, a book of poems
 Avrom Zak, a book of poems
 M. M. Shafir, a book of poems
 L. Faynberg, a book of poems
 Sholem Shtern, a book of poems
 M. Frid-Vaninger, a book of poems
 M. Olitsky, a book of poems

Soviet Union
 Leyb Kvitko, a book of selected poems
 Shimon Halkin, My Treasury

Other
 Luo Fu, Poems from Beyond, Chinese (Taiwan)
 Einar Skjæraasen, "Sang i september" the first poem to appear since 1956 from one of Norway's most popular poets
 Pentti Saarikoski, Laulu laululta pois ("Going Away, Song by Song"), a book-length poem (Finland)
 Alexander Mezhirov, Подкова ("Podkova"), Russia, Soviet Union
 Wisława Szymborska, Poland:
 Sto pociech ("No End of Fun")
 Poezje wybrane ("Selected Poetry")

Awards and honors

Canada
 See 1967 Governor General's Awards for a complete list of winners and finalists for those awards.

United Kingdom
 Cholmondeley Award: Seamus Heaney, Brian Jones, Norman Nicholson
 Eric Gregory Award: Angus Calder, Marcus Cumberlege, David Harsent, David Selzer, Brian Patten
 Frost Medal: Marianne Moore
 Queen's Gold Medal for Poetry: Charles Causley

United States
 Bollingen Prize: Robert Penn Warren
 National Book Award for Poetry: James Merrill, Nights and Days
 Pulitzer Prize for Poetry: Anne Sexton: Live or Die
 Fellowship of the Academy of American Poets: Mark Van Doren

France
 Max Jacob Award: Édith Boissonnas, for L'Embellie
 Critics' Prize: J. Grosjean, Élégies Apollinaire Award: P. Gascar, Le Quatrième État de la matièreBirths
 January – Karen Volkman, American poet
 June 16 – Kasra Anghaee, Swiss poet
 August 22 – Valérie Rouzeau, French poet and translator
 September 21 – Suman Pokhrel, Nepali poet, lyricist, playwright, translator and artist
 October 21 – Pam Rehm, American poet
 Sia Figiel, Samoan novelist, poet and painter
 Saskia Hamilton, American poet
 Lisa Jarnot, American poet
 V. Penelope Pelizzon, American poet
 Joelle Taylor, English performance poet
 Diane Thiel, American poet and academic
 Matthew Zapruder, American poet and editor

Deaths
Birth years link to the corresponding "[year] in poetry" article:
 January 29 – Ion Buzdugan, 79 (born 1887), Romanian poet, folklorist and politician
 February 13 – Forugh Farrokhzad (born 1934), Iranian poet and film director, in automobile accident
 March 16 – Thomas MacGreevy, 72 (born 1893), Irish poet, director of the National Gallery of Ireland and member of the first Irish Arts Council
 March 30 – Jean Toomer, 72 (born 1894), American poet, novelist and important figure of the Harlem Renaissance
 May 10 – Margaret Larkin, 67 (born 1899), American writer, poet, singer-songwriter, researcher, journalist and union activist
 May 12 – John Masefield, 88 (born 1878), English Poet Laureate and author
 May 22 – Langston Hughes, 65 (born 1902), African American poet, of heart failure
 June 7 – Dorothy Parker, 73 (born 1893), American writer and poet known for her caustic wit, of heart failure
 June 23 – Sakae Tsuboi 壺井栄 (born 1899), novelist and poet
 July 13 – Yoshino Hideo 吉野秀雄 (born 1902), Japanese, Shōwa period tanka poet
 July 19 – Odell Shepard, 82 (born 1884), American historian and poet
 July 22 – Carl Sandburg, 89 (born 1878), American historian and poet, of heart failure
 July 25 – Pierre Albert-Birot, 91 (born 1876), French poet and writer
 September (exact date not known) – Christopher Okigbo, 37 (born 1930), Nigerian poet, killed in action in Nigerian Civil War
 September 1 – Siegfried Sassoon, 80 (born 1886), English poet and memoirist
 September 5 – David C. DeJong, 62, Dutch-American poet and fiction writer
 September 8 – Katka Zupančič, 77 (born 1889), Slovene-American children's poet
 September 23 – Augusto Casimiro, 78 (born 1889), Portuguese poet, founder of the Seara Nova literary review and political commentator
 October 8 – Vernon Watkins, 61 (born 1906), Welsh poet and painter, of heart failure
 November 17 – Bo Bergman, 98 (born 1869), Swedish poet
 November 30 – Patrick Kavanagh, 63 (born 1904), Irish poet and novelist, of pneumonia
 Date not known – Randall Swingler (born 1909), English poet, librettist, publisher and flautist

See also

 Poetry
 List of poetry awards
 List of years in poetry

References
 Lal, P., Modern Indian Poetry in English: An Anthology & a Credo'', Calcutta: Writers Workshop, second edition, 1971 (however, on page 597 an "editor's note" states contents "on the following pages are a supplement to the first edition" and is dated "1972"); hereafter "P. Lal (1971)"

Poetry
20th-century poetry